The Olcott Formation is a geologic formation in Nebraska. It preserves fossils dating to the Barstovian stage of the Neogene period.

See also

 List of fossiliferous stratigraphic units in Nebraska
 Paleontology in Nebraska

References
 

Neogene geology of Nebraska
Barstovian
Miocene Series of North America